Colex Enterprises was a joint venture company between Columbia Pictures Television and LBS Communications, Inc., active from January 30, 1984, to November 24, 1986. The name of the joint venture is a portmanteau of the two companies' names (Columbia and Lexington, the latter coming from LBS' original name of Lexington Broadcast Services). It came after Columbia and LBS agreed to distribute the TV show Family, which LBS distributed under license from Columbia Pictures Television. Family was then added to Colex's roster when the company formed, and the first new show added to Colex's roster was the show Gidget. It was designed to handle syndication of barter series on an advertised-supported basis, mostly of obscure TV shows that never made it into syndication before. It was also responsible for syndicating What's Happening!!, which led to the revival series as mentioned below.

Colex was split into four branches in 1985, which are Colex First-Run, which distributed new material, such as The New Gidget, and two telemovies, under the Colex Premiere Movies banner, The Colex Collection, which handled distribution of newer off-network product, The Colex 3-Pack, which consists of mini-series and The Colex Classics, which will continue distribution of several shows.

The company was responsible for distributing the Screen Gems television output, as well as many of the post-1948 Bob Hope theatrical output, with the exception of Hanna-Barbera produced programs. Colex also distributed the syndicated sitcom series What's Happening Now!! and The New Gidget, which was later distributed by LBS and Coca-Cola Telecommunications on its final season.

History
January 30, 1984 - The company was created.
1986 - Colex was closed out and was succeeded by LBS Communications Inc./Coca-Cola Telecommunications.
1995 - Columbia TriStar Television Distribution (CTTD) was formed to distribute the library;
2001 - CTTD merged with Columbia TriStar Television in 2001 to form Columbia TriStar Domestic Television, which is now known as Sony Pictures Television since 2002.

Programming distributed by Colex Enterprises

TV programs
 Father Knows Best (1954-1960)
 The George Burns and Gracie Allen Show (1950-1958)
Route 66 (1960-1964)
Gidget (1965-1966)
The Flying Nun (1967-1970)
Ghost Story/Circle of Fear (1972-1973)
Family (1976-1980)
What's Happening!! (1976-1979)
Father Murphy (1981-1983)

film
 1941 (1979) (distribution only)
 The Amazing Mr. X (aka The Spiritualist) (1948) (distribution only)
 An American Christmas Carol (1979) (distribution only)
 The Ballad of Gregorio Cortez (1982) (distribution only)
 Brute Force (1947) (distribution only)
 The Corsican Brothers (1941) (distribution only)
 Count Three and Pray (1955)
 The Electric Horseman (1979) (distribution only)
 Force 10 from Navarone (1978) (distribution only)
 Gunman's Walk (1958)
 He Walked by Night (1948) (distribution only)
 Impact (1949) (distribution only)
 The Killers (1946) (distribution only)
 The Killers (1964) (distribution only)
 Lonely Are the Brave (1962) (distribution only) 
 M (1951) 
 The Naked City (1948) (distribution only)
 Patterns (1956) (distribution only)
 Phantom Lady (1944) (distribution only)
 3:10 to Yuma (1957)
 The Prowler (1951) (distribution only)
 Quicksand (1950) (distribution only)
 Raw Deal (1948) (distribution only)
 Tomahawk (1951) (distribution only)
 Trapped (1949) (distribution only)
 Tulsa (1949) (distribution only)
 The Virginian (1946) (distribution only)
 Whistle Stop (1946) (distribution only)
 Wings of the Hawk (1953) (distribution only)

TV film
 Fear No Evil (1969) (distribution only)
 Gidget Gets Married (1972)
 Ritual of Evil (1970) (distribution only)
 Three Wishes for Jamie (1987)

References

Defunct mass media companies of the United States
Sony Pictures Television
Mass media companies established in 1984
Mass media companies disestablished in 1986
Joint ventures
Television syndication distributors